Raymond Cecil Palmer, 3rd Baron Palmer OBE (24 June 1916 – 1990) was a British peer and business man, a member of the House of Lords from 1950 until his death.

Early life
The son of Ernest Cecil Nottage Palmer, 2nd Baron Palmer and his wife Marguerite Osborne, Palmer was educated at Harrow School and University College, Oxford. He was commissioned as a Lieutenant into the Grenadier Guards, but retired, injured.

Career
On 6 June 1950, Palmer succeeded his father as Baron Palmer in the peerage of the United Kingdom, giving him a seat in the House of Lords. He also became the third Palmer baronet.

He became chairman of Huntley & Palmers and of Huntley, Boorne & Stevens, a director of Associated Biscuit Manufacturers, and president of the Thames Valley Trustee Savings Bank.

Personal life
On 30 January 1941, Palmer married Victoria Ellen Stevens, daughter of Captain Joseph Arthur Ronald Weston Stevens, and they had 
three daughters:
Amanda Victoria Palmer (1949–1954)
Carol Lylie Palmer (born 1951), who married John Wodehouse, future Earl of Kimberley, and is the mother of David Wodehouse, Lord Wodehouse (born 1978).
Vanessa Marguerite Palmer (born 1954)

Honours
Officer of the Order of the British Empire, 1968

Arms

Notes

1916 births
1990 deaths
People educated at Harrow School
Barons in the Peerage of the United Kingdom
Raymond